Sahitya Akademi Award to Maithili language Writers by Sahitya Akademi. No Awards were conferred in 1957, 1959, 1966 and 1972.

Recipients

References

Maithili literature
Maithili